Gummy supplements, commonly called gummy vitamins, are dietary supplements delivered as gummy-candy-like products. They are considered more palatable than other vitamin formulations but may lead to excessive sugar consumption.

Gummy supplements may be derived from herbal supplements, containing extracts from plants like ashwagandha and cannabis, as well as the algae-derived astaxanthin. Gummy supplements for hair health have been advertised in social media by influencers but there are concerns regarding efficacy and safety.

Global sales of gummy vitamins in 2022 are estimated to be over US$7 billion.

What is So Unique About Multivitamin Gummies? 
In addition to their soft texture, vitamins are also available in chewable gummies in a variety of flavors, sizes, and colors. Many people, especially kids, don't enjoy swallowing pills. Luckily, gummies are easy to swallow, and this is one of the reasons why these nutrient sweets are so popular. The most common ingredients in gummy candies are collagen, gelatin, sugar, cornstarch, artificial flavors, and food coloring. Thus, they are often called gummy candies to simplify pronunciation.

Some of the most popular kinds of gummy candies are strawberry gummy, orange gummy, peach gummy, raspberry gummy, and a variety of others.

Furthermore, gummy vitamins are extremely cheap, so more and more people are swapping their multivitamin tablets for gummies. That's why gummies are unique, especially multivitamin gummies.

Benefits of Vitamin Gummies 
There are lots of benefits, but the following are some common benefits we known, 

 Enhances energy levels.
 Maintains proper cardiac health.
 Improve eyesight
 Improves cognitive functions.
 Saviour of muscles.
 Improves our mental health.
 Revamps hair.
 Boosts your skin health

See also 
 Gummy candy
 Multivitamins

References 

Dietary supplements
Vitamins

